That's Him is a 1918 American short comedy film featuring Harold Lloyd. The film survives in a 28mm print down.

Cast
 Harold Lloyd 
 Snub Pollard 
 Bebe Daniels 
 Lige Conley - (as Lige Cromley)
 William Gillespie
 Helen Gilmore
 Lew Harvey
 Gus Leonard
 Marie Mosquini
 James Parrott
 Charles Stevenson

See also
 Harold Lloyd filmography

References

External links

1918 films
Silent American comedy films
American silent short films
1918 comedy films
1918 short films
American black-and-white films
Films directed by Gilbert Pratt
American comedy short films
1910s American films